Mândrești may refer to several villages in Romania:

 Mândrești, a village in Ungureni Commune, Botoșani County
 Mândrești, a village in Vlădeni Commune, Botoșani County
 Mândrești, a village in Valea Mărului Commune, Galați County
 Mândrești-Moldova and Mândrești-Munteni, villages administered by Focșani city, Vrancea County